A Concrete Aboriginal, also known as a Neville, is a lawn ornament once common in Australia. The ornament is a concrete statue depicting an Aboriginal Australian, generally carrying a spear and often standing on one leg.  The statues were once common in Australia but rarely seen since the 1980s.

 

The fashion for keeping a concrete Aboriginal in the garden was satirised in the Australian 1980s situation comedy Kingswood Country, where the lead character referred to his concrete Aboriginal as "Neville". The name "Neville" was thought to be a reference to Neville Bonner, the first Aboriginal Australian to sit in the Parliament of Australia.

See also
Lawn ornament
Lawn jockey
Cigar store Indian
Blackamoor
Garden gnome
Jew with a coin

References

Australian culture
Garden ornaments